Gordon Doherty is a Scottish historical novelist whose works centre mainly on Classical Antiquity.

Biography
Graduating from university with a degree in Physics, Gordon pursued a career in the science and technology sector. In his spare time, he studied history voraciously, and began working on his first Legionary novel - set in the late Roman Empire on the cusp of the Great Migration that would see many tribes including the Huns arrive at the empire's doorstep. Launched in 2011 during the self-publishing boom, Legionary proved to be a great success, and a launch pad for Gordon's writing career. He has gone on to write over twenty further novels, set in the Roman Empire, Byzantium, Classical Greece and the Bronze Age. These have been released both independently and through publishers like Penguin and Head of Zeus. Gordon now writes full-time and is represented by Watson, Little Ltd Literary Agency. He lives with his wife and cats near the ruins of the Antonine Wall.

Bibliography

Series

Legionary
Eagles in the Desert (2020)
Legionary (2011)
Viper of the North (2012)
Land of the Sacred Fire (2013)
The Scourge of Thracia (2015)
Gods & Emperors (2015)
Empire of Shades (2017)
The Blood Road (2018)
Dark Eagle (2020)
The Emperor's Shield (2023)

Strategos
Born in the Borderlands (2011)
Rise of the Golden Heart (2013)
Island in the Storm (2014)

Empires of Bronze
Son of Ishtar (2019)
Dawn of War (2020)
Thunder at Kadesh (2020)
The Crimson Throne (2021)
The Shadow of Troy (2021)
The Dark Earth (2022)

Rise of Emperors 
(with Simon Turney)
Sons of Rome (2020)
Masters of Rome (2021)
Gods of Rome (2021)

Series contributed to

Assassin's Creed
 Assassin's Creed Odyssey (2018)

HWA Short Story Collection
 Rubicon (2019) (with Nick Brown, Ruth Downie, Richard Foreman, Alison Morton, Anthony Riches, Antonia Senior, Peter Tonkin and L J Trafford)

References

External links
 Author's official website

Living people
Scottish historical novelists
21st-century Scottish novelists
Writers of historical fiction set in antiquity
Scottish male novelists
1978 births